Jaakko Juhani Pakkasvirta (28 November 1934 – 23 March 2018) was a Finnish film director and  screenwriter. He directed more than 30 films between 1958 and 2000. His 1975 film Home for Christmas was entered into the 9th Moscow International Film Festival. His 1978 film Poet and Muse was entered into the 11th Moscow International Film Festival.

Partial filmography

 Sankarialokas (1955) as Alokas
 Tyttö lähtee kasarmiin (1956) as Alokas
 Pekka ja Pätkä Suezilla (1958) as Vartija (uncredited)
 Sotapojan heilat (1958) as Alokas
 Mies tältä tähdeltä (1958) as Erkki Paarala
 Patarouva (1959) as Stable master
 Iloinen Linnanmäki (1960) as Sorri
 Rakas... (1961) as Jaska
 Meren juhlat (1963) as Jaska, artist
 Hopeaa rajan takaa (1963) as Ese Wist
 X-paroni (1964) as James
 Onnenpeli (1965) as Jussi
 The Diary of a Worker (1967) as Priest (voice)
 Time of Roses (1969, director)
 Niilon oppivuodet (1971) as Interviewer in rock club (uncredited)
 Home for Christmas (1975, director)
 Poet and Muse (1978) as Otto Manninen
 Sign of the Beast (1981, director)
 Ulvova mylläri (1982) as Jeesus (voice)
 Valkoinen kääpiö (1986) as Tomas Borg
 Linna (1986) as Bürgel / Narrator

References

External links

1934 births
2018 deaths
People from Rautjärvi
Finnish film directors
Finnish screenwriters
Finnish film producers
Finnish film editors
20th-century Finnish male actors